Marble Mountain is a ski resort located in the town of Steady Brook, on the west coast of Newfoundland in the Long Range Mountains.

As the name implies, marble is present but it forms only a minor part of the bedrock, which is mostly schist. The peak is named in honour of Sir Anthony Musgrave, a colonial governor of Newfoundland.

Lower elevations of Marble Mountain outside of the ski lanes are covered with a rich mixed forest of abundant balsam fir, white spruce, black spruce and white birch, with some red maple and mountain maple. At higher elevations, black spruce is often dominant and deciduous trees are less abundant.

Marble Mountain is the site of the largest alpine ski resort in Atlantic Canada.  Environment Canada's doppler weather radar station "XME", part of the Canadian weather radar network is located near the resort at the summit of Mount Musgrave.

This produces a three-month ski season. In the winter of 2013/2014, the resort saw more than 21 feet of natural snowfall and in the 2014/2015 season, nearly 20 feet of natural snow fell. Marble Mountain was a key venue for the 1999 Canada Winter Games hosted by Corner Brook.

Marble Mountain boasts the only detachable high speed quad lift in Atlantic Canada, the Lightning Express.

On June 29, 2018, the provincial government announced that it would be seeking a request for proposals to divest the government of ownership of Marble Mountain. The resort has been operated by the provincial government since 1988 through the Marble Mountain Development Corporation. The ski hill receives an annual subsidy of close to $1 million.

As of late June 2022 moves are under way to make Marble Mountain an all-season resort with more emphasis on summer recreation.

Trails 

 (m) – mogul runs
(g) – gladed trail with trees

Lifts

See also
List of ski areas and resorts in Canada
Weather radar on Marble Mountain

References

External links
Marble Mountain Ski Resort
Satellite Photo of Marble Mountain
Weather data from XME radar
Marble Race Team
Official Newfoundland and Labrador Tourism Website - Marble Mountain

Ski areas and resorts in Newfoundland